Middleton is a district of Milton Keynes, Buckinghamshire, England, and part of the historic civil parish of Milton Keynes (which predates the 1967 foundation of the "new city"). The district is centred on Milton Keynes Village, the village that gave its name to the City of Milton Keynes, which surrounds it extensively.  The village also gives its name to the local civil parish, of which Middleton is the more populated district. It is delineated by Childs Way to the north, Tongwell Street to the east, Chaffron Way to the south and Brickhill Street to the west. The River Ouzel runs diagonally through it, from west to north.

History

The village was originally known as Middeltone (11th century); then later as Middelton Kaynes or Caynes (13th century); Milton Keynes (15th century); and Milton alias Middelton Gaynes (17th century). After the Norman invasion, the de Cahaines family held the manor from 1166 to the late 13th century as well as others in the country (Ashton Keynes in Wiltshire, Somerford Keynes in Gloucestershire, and Horsted Keynes in West Sussex). During this time the village became known as Middleton Keynes  eventually shortening to 'Milton Keynes'.
However, the names "Mydilton Keynes" and "Milton Keynes" appear on the same membrane of the Plea Roll, CP40/764, dated 1452. 

The original core village of the district, along Walton Road and Broughton Road,  has retained its "Milton Keynes" road signs and has several rural village houses and a thatched pub which dates back to the 13th century.  It is now known as "Milton Keynes Village".

Education
The district has two schools, Middleton Primary School and Oakgrove School, a secondary comprehensive.  Both were built in the early 2000s, in the southwest of the district.

Civil parish
Early in the development of Milton Keynes (the 'city'), the district (in which the original village lies and after which it was named) was given the name Middleton again. However, the civil parish is still formally called Milton Keynes, and has a joint parish council with Broughton, called Broughton and Milton Keynes Parish Council.  (The civil parish for the 'new city' centre is called "Central Milton Keynes"). Milton Keynes civil parish consists of Middleton district and the neighbouring grid-squares of Oakgrove, Fox Milne and Pineham.

References

External links
 Broughton and Milton Keynes Parish Council web site.

Areas of Milton Keynes